Frederick Rogers may refer to:
Frederick Rogers (bookbinder) (1846–1915), English bookbinder, writer and trades unionist
Fred Rogers (1928–2003), American educator, clergyman, songwriter, author, and television host
Fred Rogers (American football) (fl. 1890s), American college football coach
Fred Rogers (footballer) (1910–?), English footballer
Frederic Rogers, 1st Baron Blachford (1811–1889),  British civil servant
Sir Frederick Rogers, 4th Baronet, of the Rogers baronets
Sir Frederick Rogers, 5th Baronet (1746–1797), of the Rogers baronets, British politician, MP for Plymouth
Sir Frederick Rogers, 7th Baronet, of the Rogers baronets
Fred Rogers (cricketer) (1918-1998), New Zealand cricketer

See also
Frederick Rodgers (1842–1917), officer in the United States Navy
Rogers (surname)